Mother Teresa Regional School (MTRS) was a Catholic school, which offered grades pre-K to eighth, in the Diocese of Trenton in Atlantic Highlands, New Jersey, USA.  The principal was Tom Sorci before the school's closure. MTRS offered many sports programs and encouraged student participation in the variety of in-school and after school groups and clubs. The school year was broken down into three trimesters.

Athletics
The athletic programs it offered included basketball, baseball, track and the New Jersey Devils sponsored "Street Devils" floor hockey program, which ran for two seasons each school year, in the fall and spring. The hockey program had involved the likes of former NHL players Grant Marshall, Jim Dowd, and Bruce Driver who participated in events with parents, children and players. Dowd was a part of a special "Hockey Cares" fundraiser on September 24, 2011, in which more than $1000 was raised to benefit local hurricane relief for the American Red Cross. The event was very popular and featured in an issue of the Monitor, the official newspaper for the Diocese of Trenton. In October 2013, the hockey league sponsored a breast cancer awareness charity game called "Stick it to Cancer", where over $1,200 was raised.

Elective programs
Mother Teresa Regional School offered a variety of elective classes for its middle school sector. Each course lasted approximately twelve weeks, for each of the three school trimesters. Students chose three of the following programs, some of which were not offered anywhere else in the state: science, study skills, American Civil War, World War II, baking, Irish history, toddler time, psychology for kids, photography, computer repair, career planning, yearbook assembly, and health and wellness.

Learning Academy
Beginning in October 2011, the school began a Learning Academy, which offered after-school and weekend enrichment programs for students aged two to fourteen in the Bayshore area. These programs were open to all children, and were not limited to students of the school or children of parishioners. The academy aimed to offer more than twenty programs per season, including topics such as sports, history, science, and dance.

Closure
In June 2016, it was announced by the Diocese of Trenton that Mother Teresa would be closing.

External links
 
 Closure: http://www.app.com/story/news/education/education-trends/2016/01/20/school-closures-deter-catholic-students/79005980/

References 

Private elementary schools in New Jersey
Schools in Monmouth County, New Jersey
Private middle schools in New Jersey
Atlantic Highlands, New Jersey